Capital North West and Wales is a regional radio station owned and operated by Global as part of the Capital network. It broadcasts to Cheshire, the Wirral Peninsula & North Wales. The station broadcasts from its studios in Gwersyllt, Wrexham, the former headquarters of Marcher Radio Group.

The station was previously part of the Heart radio network, which began broadcasting on 2 July 2010 as a result of a merger between Heart Cheshire and North East Wales (formerly Marcher Sound), Heart Wirral (formerly Wirral's Buzz) and Heart North Wales Coast (formerly Coast 96.3). It switched to Capital on 6 May 2014.

History

The regional station originally broadcast as three separate stations - Marcher Sound began broadcasting to North East Wales and Cheshire in January 1983, MFM 97.1 (later Wirral's Buzz) served the Wirral and parts of east Flintshire since March 1989 and Marcher Coast (later Coast 96.3) broadcast to the North Wales Coast from August 1993 onwards.

These stations were owned and operated by the Marcher Radio Group until the GWR Group's purchase in 2000. Five years later, the owners merged with Capital Radio to form GCap Media (later Global Radio).

By 2008, locally produced programming had been cut back to daily four-hour breakfast shows and a regional weekday drivetime show from Wrexham for the Marcher, Coast and Wirral areas, although Coast retained an opt-out for Welsh language programming. The stations were rebranded as Heart a year later.

On 21 June 2010, Global Radio announced it would merge the stations as part of plans to reduce the Heart network of stations from 33 to 16. The new station began broadcasting on Friday 2 July 2010, leading to the closure of the Bangor studios.

The former North Wales Coast station retains an opt-out for an hour-long Welsh language music programme six days a week and early morning news bulletins in the Welsh language.

On 6 February 2014, Global announced that Heart North West & Wales would be rebranded as Capital FM, with the North Wales licence of Real Radio Wales being sold to Communicorp and relaunched as a new separate Heart station for North and Mid Wales. The rebranding to Capital took place on 6 May 2014.

On 26 February 2019, Global confirmed the station's local breakfast and weekend shows would be replaced with networked programming from April 2019. The weekday Drivetime show was retained alongside news bulletins, traffic updates and advertising. Sister station Capital Cymru, serving Anglesey and Gwynedd, retains its full schedule of local programming due to separate Welsh-language requirements.

On digital radio

Following the relaunch of Heart NW&W as Capital in 2014, the  Wirral version of the service replaced Capital Manchester on Bauer's central Liverpool DAB multiplex, the Manc service having broadcast there following the closure of MXR North West. Following the relaunch of Juice FM as Capital Liverpool at the start of 2016, that service replaced Capital Wirral on Liverpool DAB; the Wirral service is now no longer transmitted on digital radio.

Since August 2016, MuxCo's 'North East Wales and West Cheshire' multiplex - which covers a similar footprint to the Capital FM frequencies for Wrexham/Chester and Wirral combined - has carried the Wrexham/Chester  FM version of Capital; this took over the slot here from Capital Liverpool, which had inherited the space on this multiplex formerly occupied by Juice FM.

The  FM North Wales Coast service is transmitted on MuxCo's North West Wales DAB multiplex, which went on air at the end of 2014.

Programming
All networked programming originates from Global's London headquarters, including Capital Breakfast with Roman Kemp.

Local programming is produced and broadcast from Global's Wrexham studios from 4-7pm on weekdays, presented by Ben Sheppard. An additional Welsh-language music programme airs from 5-6am on Sunday - Friday mornings on  FM on the North Wales Coast, presented by Alastair James.

News
Global's Newsroom broadcasts hourly localised news updates from 6am-7pm on weekdays and 6am-12pm at weekends with headlines on the half-hour during Capital Breakfast on weekdays.

Separate bulletins for the Wirral on  FM are produced from Global's Merseyside newsroom in Liverpool.

References

External links
 

Radio stations in Wales
Radio stations in Merseyside
North West and Wales
Marcher Radio Group
Radio stations established in 2010
Defunct Heart (radio network) stations